Radioactive waste disposal may refer to:
High-level radioactive waste management
Low-level waste disposal
Ocean disposal of radioactive waste
Ocean floor disposal
Deep borehole disposal
Deep geological repository

See also
Radioactive waste#Management
Toxic waste dumping by the 'Ndrangheta